The 2010–11 Liga de Honra season was the 21st season of the second-tier football in Portugal. A total of 16 teams will contest the league, 12 of which already contested in the 2009–10, and two of which were promoted from the Portuguese Second Division, and two of which were relegated from 2009–10. The official ball is Adidas Jabulani.

Changes in 2010–11

Team changes

Teams relegated from 2009–10 Primeira Liga
 15th Place: Belenenses
 16th Place: Leixões

Teams promoted to 2010–11 Portuguese Liga
 Champions: Beira-Mar
 Runners-up: Portimonense

Teams promoted from 2009–10 Segunda Divisão
 Champions: Arouca
 Runners-up: Moreirense

Teams relegated to 2010–11 Segunda Divisão
 15th Place: Chaves
 16th Place: Carregado

Personnel and kits

Managerial changes

League table

Positions by round

Results

Stats

Top goalscorers

List of 2010–11 transfers

References

External links
Official webpage 
Official regulation 
Official Statistics 

Liga Portugal 2 seasons
Port
2010–11 in Portuguese football leagues